Ian Samuel Totman  is an English-born New Zealand musician best known as guitarist and main songwriter for the power metal band DragonForce.

Early life
Totman was born in England and grew up mainly in New Zealand. He moved back to England around age 22 because England's music scene offered numerous shows to attend every week—an option he did not have in geographically isolated New Zealand. He began playing classical guitar at the age of nine—receiving formal training for several years.

Career
Totman was part of the black power metal band Demoniac—which also featured his future DragonForce bandmate Herman Li. During his time with Demoniac Totman was referred to as Heimdall (the Norse God of vigilance). Demoniac struggled to achieve any real fame outside of Australasia despite releasing three albums and relocating to London, UK.  Demoniac split sometime in late 1999 shortly after the album The Fire and the Wind was released. Most of the members went on to form power metal band DragonHeart which later became known as DragonForce. Keyboardist Steve Williams and bassist Steve Scott left Dragonheart to form Power Quest with whom Totman recorded on their demo as well as their first album Wings of Forever. Totman also provided guest instrumentation on the band's following album Neverworld.

As the songwriter Totman wrote both music and lyrics for a majority of DragonForce's discography.

References

External links
 Totman's profile at DragonForce.com
 DragonForce official website

1979 births
DragonForce members
English heavy metal guitarists
English emigrants to New Zealand
Living people
Musicians from London
Rhythm guitarists